Senator Norris may refer to:

Edwin L. Norris (1865–1924), Montana State Senate
George W. Norris (1861–1944), Nebraska State Senate
Mark Norris (judge) (born 1955), Tennessee State Senate
Moses Norris Jr. (1799–1855), U.S. Senator from New Hampshire from 1849 to 1855
Robert O. Norris Jr. (1880–1960), Virginia State Senate
William Hutchinson Norris (1800–1893),  Alabama State Senate